The Unagalawehera Rajamaha Viharaya is a Buddhist temple in Hingurakgoda, Sri Lanka. It is an ancient site with temple complexes and ruins which are considered to belong to the early period of the Anuradhapura era.

Ancient stupa
The Unagalavehera Stupa is the second largest stupa outside of Polonnaruwa.

Ancient monastery complex
During the reign of King Dappula IV (923-935 AD) this temple was known as Puvaram (Purvarama) Rajamaha Viharaya.This temple was affiliated to the Ritigala monastery.At that time the land where this temple is located was known as 'Hinginiwella'.Later this monastery complex was renovated by King Parakramabahu I (1153-1186 AD).This monastery complex has been constructed in the tradition of the Maha Vihara with the center of the stupa. The ruined buildings belonging to the monastery complex is located in the surrounding of stupa.

Annual temple flower offering ceremony
The 'Annual Temple Flower Offering Ceremony' or 'Araliya Mal Poojawa' is  Sri Lanka's first temple flower offering ceremony.The offering of one million temple flowers began in 1995.

References

Religious buildings and structures in Polonnaruwa
Buddhist temples in Polonnaruwa District
Stupas in Sri Lanka
Archaeological protected monuments in Polonnaruwa District